Sumaman Senior High School is a public senior high school located in Suma-Ahenkro in the Jaman North District in the Bono Region of Ghana.

History 
The Omanhene and elders of the Suma Traditional Area established the school in September 1981 as a community day secondary school. In September 1989, it was fully absorbed after it was initially partially absorbed into the public stream. In 2022, the school won the Bono Regional Renewable Energy Challenge.

Notable past students 

 Professor Kwadwo Adinkrah-Appiah, Vice-Chancellor of Sunyani Technical University
 Mr. Samuel Obour, Registrar of Sunyani Technical University
 Alex Kwasi Awuah, managing director of ARB Apex Bank

References 

High schools in Ghana
1981 establishments in Ghana
Education in Ghana